Bannister Hall and Baynard House is a national historic district located near Smyrna, Kent County, Delaware. It includes structures dating from 1750. The property was listed on the National Register of Historic Places in 1973.

Baynard House has also been named Fox Hall.

The cupola-topped Bannister Hall building "may have been the first pre-fabricated house erected in Delaware" although in appearance it is "typical of Delaware country mansions of the Victorian period."

References

Houses on the National Register of Historic Places in Delaware
Historic districts on the National Register of Historic Places in Delaware
Houses completed in 1750
Houses in Kent County, Delaware
National Register of Historic Places in Kent County, Delaware